Corriere del Ticino is a regional daily newspaper in the canton of Ticino, Switzerland.

History and profile
Corriere del Ticino was established in 1891. The paper is published in the Italian language in Muzzano, Ticino.

In the early 1990s Corriere del Ticino had a circulation of 36,000 copies. In 1997 the paper had a circulation of 37,742 copies.

See also
 LaNotizia
 List of newspapers in Switzerland

References

External links
 Official website

1891 establishments in Switzerland
Newspapers established in 1891
Daily newspapers published in Switzerland
Italian-language newspapers published in Switzerland
Culture in Ticino